Akāla-jalada (c. 8th–9th century) was a Sanskrit-language poet from the Tripuri Kalachuri kingdom of present-day Central India. He was the great-grandfather of the Gurjara-Pratihara court poet Rajashekhara.

Biography 

Akalajalada was the great-grandfather of the 10th century poet Rajashekhara, so he must have lived in the 8th century or 9th century. He came from the Yayavara Brahmana family of Maharashtra: Rajashekhara's Bala-Ramayana calls him Maharashtra-chudamani ("crest jewel of Maharashtra"). The prologue of the text names the poets Surananda and Tarala as other members of this family. These ancestors of Rajashekhara flourished at the court of the Kalachuris of Tripuri.

"Akalajalada" (literally "out-of-season cloud") was probably a sobriquet, not the poet's real name. The poet was also known by other names, including Dakshinatya and Dvanduka. A verse attributed to Akalajalada in Sharngadhara-paddhati is attributed to Dakshinatya ("Southern") in Vallabha-deva's Subhashitavali. Vidyakara's Subhashita-ratna-kosha attributes the same verse to "Dvanduka".

According to a verse by Rajashekhara, quoted by the 12th century writer Jalhana, a dramatist named Kadambari-rama plagiarized from Akalajalada for a nataka (play), and gained reputation as an excellent poet.

Works 

Only one verse attributed to Akalajalada is now extant. Its English translation by A. K. Warder is as follows:

Alternative translation by M. C. Choubey, according to whom this is the description of a drought in the Tripuri Kalachuri kingdom:

A verse attributed to Rajashekhara in Jalhana's Sukti-muktavali suggests that Akalajalada had written many muktakas (detached stanzas). These were later compiled into a collection titled Vachana-Chandrika, which was highly appreciated by 77 contemporary poets.

References

Bibliography 

 
 
 
 
 
 

Sanskrit poets
9th-century Indian poets
Kalachuris of Tripuri
Indian male poets